Headquarters is a ghost town in Wheeler County, Nebraska, United States.

History
A post office was established at Headquarters in 1908, and remained in operation until it was discontinued in 1917.

References

Geography of Wheeler County, Nebraska